The Metropolitan Nashville Airport Authority (MNAA) manages Nashville, Tennessee's airport systems. The system includes one general aviation airport, John C. Tune Airport and one commercial airport, Nashville International Airport.

References

Airport operators of the United States
Transportation in Nashville, Tennessee
1970 establishments in Tennessee